Galesburg is an unincorporated community in northwest Jasper County in southwest Missouri, United States. The community is located on the south bank of the Spring River, approximately twelve miles north of Joplin.

History
Galesburg was laid out in 1869. A post office called Galesburg was established in 1869, and remained in operation until 1907.

References

Unincorporated communities in Jasper County, Missouri
Unincorporated communities in Missouri